Kittle is a surname. 

Notable people bearing it include:
 Hub Kittle (1917–2004), American baseball player and manager
 Ron Kittle (born 1958), American baseball player
 Katrina Kittle (fl. 2000s), American novelist
 George Kittle (born 1993), American football tight end
 Cameron Kittle (born 2002), American football cornerback

See also
 Kittel (surname)
 Kittles